On November 30, 2018, at 8:29 a.m. AKST (17:29 UTC), a magnitude 7.1 earthquake hit Anchorage in South Central Alaska. The earthquake could be felt as far away as Fairbanks.

Tectonic setting 
Southern Alaska lies at the eastern end of the Aleutian Trench, where the Pacific Plate is subducting beneath the North American Plate. Near Anchorage, the plates are converging at a rate of 57 mm per year. The region has experienced severe earthquakes in the past, including several megathrust earthquakes. The 1964 earthquake, with a magnitude of 9.2, was the largest earthquake in American history and the second largest to ever be recorded anywhere in the world. Though earthquakes are common in Alaska, they often occur out at sea. This earthquake is more similar to the 2001 Nisqually earthquake located near Tacoma, Washington, than to the 1964 megathrust earthquake.

Earthquake 
The earthquake had a magnitude of 7.1 on the moment magnitude scale using a centroid moment tensor inversion of the W-phase. The focal mechanism shows that the earthquake was a result of normal faulting. A fault dipping at 29° towards the east gives the best match to the observed seismic waveforms. The depth and mechanism are consistent with faulting within the down-going Pacific Plate. This implies that the earthquake was an intraslab earthquake within that plate, rather than at the plate boundary between the Pacific and North American Plates beneath the Anchorage area. This is a different mechanism than megathrust faults in the region, which do occur on the plate boundary itself. This faulting in the Pacific Plate is caused by downward bending while the plate is being forced under Alaska.

Aftershocks 

Over 80 aftershocks of various magnitudes were recorded throughout the day, with at least three having magnitudes greater than 5.0. By December 3, 170 aftershocks with a magnitude over 3.0 had been noted. Two more aftershocks hit on February 6, the first with a magnitude of 4.1, and the second coming 23 minutes later with a magnitude of 3.7. Aftershocks were expected to continue for around 300 days after the mainshock.

Damage 
Severe damage to several buildings and a highway overpass near Ted Stevens Anchorage International Airport was reported. There were no fatalities, but at least 117 people were injured, mostly for minor injuries such as cuts, bruises or anxiety. Some suffered broken bones, and one resident suffered serious smoke inhalation while trying to put out a post-quake fire at his home. The Kenai Peninsula Borough School District reported that all students were safe.

Landings at three airports were temporarily affected by the earthquake: the Ted Stevens International Airport, Merrill Field Airport and Joint Base Elmendorf–Richardson. The Anchorage Police Department reported major infrastructure damage across the city. Liquefaction was reported. Several traffic lights were knocked down, bringing traffic to a halt. Many roads were also damaged. The Glenn Highway was damaged to the point where officials stated it would likely take a long time to repair. A ramp connecting Minnesota Drive to area streets collapsed, as well as the surrounding hillside. A driver in an SUV who was on the section of destroyed highway was stranded, but uninjured. The Alaska Railroad had to suspend all operations due to severe damage at their operations center and unknown condition of tracks. The operators of the Trans-Alaska Pipeline shut the system down as a precaution; however, they reported that there is no known damage to the pipeline and it later resumed service.

The newsroom studio of KTVA in Anchorage (then affiliated with CBS) was heavily damaged, but the channel remained on the air. The Alaska Airlines Center, a large sports complex on the University of Alaska Anchorage (UAA) campus, flooded due to broken fire sprinkler pipes. Several trophy cases were also damaged. UAA's older Wells Fargo Sports Complex suffered similar damage. In South Anchorage, Dimond High School had ceiling tiles and other debris littering the floor throughout the campus. Most schools in the Anchorage School District suffered damage. Along with Dimond High, Colony Middle, Colony High and Bartlett High School were also heavily damaged. Colony Middle School suffered damage to ceiling tiles, water pipes, and lights and was being evaluated for structural damage. During the earthquake, a student suffered a broken wrist, and a custodian was injured by breaking glass at area schools. Several branches in the Anchorage Public Library system sustained damage. Numerous books were knocked off the shelves, which took days to clean up. Structural damage was noted in some locations. In the Anchorage community of Eagle River, at least one home collapsed during the earthquake. One man in the home, whose spouse was at work, was able to escape with several pets.

There was also heavy damage in the Matanuska-Susitna Valley (Mat-Su), north of Anchorage. The Matanuska-Susitna Borough School District reported that Houston Middle School, located in the town of Houston, was severely damaged, and students were forced to merge with their high school for the remainder of the year. Five other Mat-Su schools took over a week to reopen. Colony Middle School students were the last to return to learning.

Significant damage was also done to roads in the Mat-Su. Among the most heavily damaged roads were the Palmer-Wasilla Highway, Pittman Road, Point MacKenzie Road and Vine Road. Suffering the worst damage was Vine Road, a section of which buckled and became impassable. In addition, Matanuska Electric Association reported that 46,000 customers were left without electricity immediately after the earthquake.

Overall, damage in Anchorage was estimated to be at least US$30 million, including $10 million to repair pipes, and $10 million in public facilities. Damage estimates to the Anchorage School District ranged from $25 to $50 million.

Response 

A federal disaster was declared shortly after the earthquake and the Federal Emergency Management Agency (FEMA) deployed personnel from the state emergency operations center at Joint Base Elmendorf-Richardson to conduct relief operations.

Alaska Governor Bill Walker said "It's been a 7.2 earthquake, but our response was a 10."

Anchorage Mayor Ethan Berkowitz likewise declared a state of emergency for his city, and requested both state and federal assistance. The local public bus system, People Mover, ended service for the day following the earthquake. The city announced that regular bus service would resume the following day, and would be free of charge for the two days following the earthquake to help city residents get around on damaged roads.

The Alaska Department of Transportation and Public Facilities moved quickly to inspect bridges and begin road repairs. Despite not normally paving during winter, area asphalt plants were restarted and within days sufficient repairs were made to reopen several heavily damaged roads.

See also 

 List of earthquakes in 2018
 List of earthquakes in Alaska
 List of earthquakes in the United States
 2018 Gulf of Alaska earthquake

References

Further reading 

Hassan, W. M., Thornley J., Rodgers, J., and Motter, C. “EERI Field Earthquake Reconnaissance: M7.1 Anchorage, Alaska Earthquake on November 30, 2018,” Earthquake Engineering Research Institute (EERI), Learning From Earthquakes (LFE) Report, Oakland, CA, 2021, http://www.learningfromearthquakes.org/2018-11-30-anchorage-alaska/index.php?option=com_content&view=article&id=72

External links 

 Event page from the IRIS Consortium

2018 earthquakes
2018 in Alaska
Earthquakes in Alaska
November 2018 events in the United States
2018 disasters in the United States
History of Anchorage, Alaska